The 1950 Nebraska Cornhuskers football team was the representative of the University of Nebraska and member of the Big 7 Conference in the 1950 college football season. The team was coached by Bill Glassford and played their home games at Memorial Stadium in Lincoln, Nebraska.

Before the season
After the dark decade of the 1940s, where the Cornhusker program found only one winning season, second-year head coach Glassford had arrived and brought a faint hope to the Cornhusker faithful by fielding a 1949 team that appeared competitive.  As coach Glassford settled in for his second year, he increased the coaching staff from seven to nine personnel, and the new decade opened with hopes that Nebraska could once again take its place among the best of the college football programs in the United States.

On April 8, 1950, Nebraska held its first ever Spring Game scrimmage (later known as the Red-White Game) against a team of Nebraska alumni players (supplemented by a handful of varsity members). The two teams played to a 13–13 tie.

Schedule

Roster

Bob Tritsch- Student Manager 1948–1951, Senior Student Manager 1950–51

Coaching staff

Game summaries

Indiana

Nebraska put a stop to Indiana's seven-game winning streak against the Cornhuskers by bringing a strong performance to the opening game of the season.  The Hoosiers escaped a defeat only by a handful of fumbles lost by Cornhusker miscues.  It was the first time since 1938 that Nebraska had fought a contest to a tie, a 0–0 scoreless affair which also happened to be against Indiana.  The Cornhuskers pulled up to 3–7–3 against Indiana to date.

Minnesota

Encouraged by the strong showing the week prior against the Hoosiers, Nebraska traveled to Minneapolis and refused to be intimidated by the Golden Gophers.  By the time Minnesota managed to score, Nebraska was already enjoying a 26–0 lead and had the Gophers on their heels.  Minnesota's adjustments after halftime brought some results, but not enough for them to escape the rare home field defeat.  Minnesota's ten-game winning streak against Nebraska was snapped at last, and the Cornhuskers reveled in their first win in Minneapolis since a 6–0 decision against the Gophers dating back to 1902.  Nebraska now stood at 5–25–2 in the series and had much ground to cover if they ever hoped to catch up, but the momentous win was cause to celebrate.  Perhaps Nebraska was finally on the way back.

Colorado

Fresh from their triumph in Minneapolis, the Cornhuskers arrived in Boulder looking for another win to establish the return of the program to greatness.  Colorado would have none of that, however, and dealt the uninspired Nebraska squad its first loss of the season to move to 3–6–3 in the series.

Penn State

Nebraska bounced back from the flat performance of the week before, and was firing on all cylinders when Penn State arrived in Lincoln for the first time ever in the third meeting of these teams.  Cornhusker HB Bobby Reynolds accounted for more personal yards on the day then the entire Nittany Lion team, and the Nebraska defense held strong to prevent Penn State from ever finding the scoreboard, securing the first Nebraska win in the series.  So far, except for the aberration in Boulder, the season had opened with exceptional success as the Cornhuskers were undefeated against three powerhouse teams, two of which were longtime rivals.

Kansas

The Cornhuskers continued to build on the season's rising tide of successes by defeating the Jayhawks in Lawrence, snapping their three-game skid against Kansas.  Nebraska was now 41–12–3 against the Jayhawks all-time.

Missouri

The 1950 homecoming game was attended by former Cornhusker football players who had battled in the 1941 Rose Bowl ten seasons prior, and the new decade's version of the Cornhuskers did not disappoint.  For the first time since 1945, Nebraska pulled in a homecoming victory, in an offensive shootout that amassed  over 1,000 combined offensive yards by both teams.  The defeat of Missouri ended a five-game Tiger winning streak, and put Nebraska ahead in the series at 25–15–3.

Kansas State

Kansas State found itself in the path of a rolling Cornhusker squad that was listed in the AP Poll for the first time since 1941, and was unable to get out of the way as the Cornhuskers hung 49 points on the scoreboard before the final whistle, which was the most points scored in a single game by Nebraska since a 53–0 blanking of lowly South Dakota in 1945.  Nebraska had now defeated the Wildcats in eight straight meetings and continued to lead the series at 28–4–2.

Iowa State

Apparently the voters in the AP Poll were not adequately impressed with Nebraska's win over downtrodden Kansas State the previous week, as the Cornhuskers actually fell two spots in the poll before facing Iowa State in Lincoln.  A single touchdown proved to be the difference in the game, as the Cyclones fought a fairly close game, holding Nebraska to under 30 points for the first time in four games.  The Cornhuskers increased their commanding series lead to 35–8–1.

Oklahoma

Nebraska faced its stiffest test of the season when the Cornhuskers traveled to Norman to close the regular season, as the Sooners held a record seven-game winning streak over Nebraska and was the #1 ranked team in the AP Poll going into the game.  Nebraska fought in front of a substantial crowd, managing to put up 35 points against the number one team in the land on their own turf, but Oklahoma romped over the Cornhusker defenses and racked up 49 points of their own to finish the season on top of the conference and the nation.  Nebraska's record single-team losing streak, held by Oklahoma, was extended to eight games.  The Sooners finished the season undefeated at 9–0–0, and closed the series record gap between the squads to 10–16–3.

Rankings

After the season

Coach Glassford's second season was a resounding success, as Nebraska end its brutal nine-season losing skid, and notched high-profile wins against Penn State and Minnesota in the process.  The season-ending loss to national champion Oklahoma could be tolerated, leaving just the one letdown loss to Colorado to truly mar the season, though the positive turnaround of fortunes was so dramatic that few would complain.  Nebraska ended the season ranked in the AP Poll for the first time in ten years.  Coach Glassford's conference record improved to 7–5–0 (.583), as his overall record climbed to 10–7–1 (.583).  The Cornhusker football program's overall record improved to 326–155–32 (.667), though the conference record declined slightly to 127–42–11 (.736).

During the 1950 football season, in order to promote the debut of its new song "Mr. Touchdown, U.S.A.," RCA offered a prize of a television set and a silver-plated album to the college football player who scored the most touchdowns during the 1950 football season. As part of the promotion, albums of "Mr. Touchdown, U.S.A." were sent to sports reporters at American newspapers. Bobby Reynolds of Nebraska ultimately claimed the prize, which was presented to him in February of 1951 by Hugo Winterhalter, the first performer of the song. Reynolds, who became best known among Nebraska fans during his legendary 1950 season, has since been described as Mr. Touchdown.

Future NFL and other professional league players
 Nick Adduci, Washington Redskins
 Ed Husmann, 1953 9th-round pick of the Chicago Cardinals
 Bobby Reynolds, 1953 7th-round pick of the Los Angeles Rams

References

Nebraska
Nebraska Cornhuskers football seasons
Nebraska Cornhuskers football